Giuliana Stramigioli (8 August 1914 – 25 July 1988) was an Italian business woman, university professor  and Japanologist.

Biography 
After graduating at the University of Rome in 1936 under the guidance of Giuseppe Tucci, Stramigioli arrived in Japan as an exchange student, specialising at Kyoto University in Japanese Language and History of the Art of Buddhism.

Having returned to her homeland after two years, she started teaching at the University of Naples, but went again to Japan to take up a scholarship offered by the Kokusai bunka shinkōkai (today Japan Foundation).

Between 1936 and 1940, she worked as a free-lance journalist, collaborating with Italian newspapers such as Gazzetta del Popolo and il Giornale d'Italia while writing an account of her travels to Korea, and a reportage about northern Japan and the Ainu people. During World War II Stramigioli served at the Italian Embassy in Japan and then at the Italian Institute of Culture.

At the end of the conflict, she started teaching Italian at Tokyo University of Foreign Languages. In 1948 she founded her firm, Italifilm, devoted to the importation of Italian movies into Japan. Through her activities, movie fans there came to know Italian Neorealism with works like Rome, open city, Bicycle Thieves,  Paisan,  and others.

Moreover, it is Stramiglioli who recommended Kurosawa Akira's Rashomon (1951) to the Venice Film Festival, where the movie was awarded the Golden Lion prize. 
In his autobiography, Kurosawa wrote:

I arrived home depressed, with barely enough strength to slide open the door to the entry. Suddenly my wife came bounding out. “Congratulations!” I was unwittingly indignant: “For what?” “Rashomon has the Grand Prix.” Rashomon had won the Grand Prix at the Venice International Film Festival, and I was spared from having to eat cold rice. Once again an angel had appeared out of nowhere. I did not even know that Rashomon had been submitted to the Venice Film Festival. The Japan representative to Italiafilm, Giuliana Stramigioli, had seen it and recommended it to Venice. It was like pouring water into the sleeping ears of the Japanese film industry. Later Rashomon won the American Academy Award for Best Foreign Language Film.

Stramigioli returned home permanently in 1965, where she kept the Professorship of Japanese Language and Literature at La Sapienza University of Rome until 1985.

She was, with Fosco Maraini among others, a founding member of the AISTUGIA – the Italian Association for the Japanese Studies.

Honours
 1982 Kunsantō hōkanshō, Order of the Precious Crown, Butterfly (Japan) 
 1988 Prize Okano (Japan)

Selected works
 
 
 
 
 
 
 
 
 
 
 
 
 
 
 
 
 
 
 
 
 items: Giappone (letteratura), pp. 65–67; Giappone (archeologia), pp. 67–68; Kawabata, pp. 282–285; Mishima, pp. 483–484; Tange Kenzo, p. 576; Tanizaki, p. 576 in  IV appendix.
items: Shōmonki, Taira no Masakado, in

References

Notes

1914 births
1988 deaths
Italian Japanologists
Businesspeople from Rome